Jan Buchtele (born July 21, 1990) is a Czech professional ice hockey forward. He currently plays for HC Sparta Praha of the Czech Extraliga (ELH).

He returned for his third tenure with Sparta Praha during the 2017–18 season, leaving HC Slovan Bratislava in the Kontinental Hockey League after producing 11 points in 41 games on January 19, 2018.

References

External links

1990 births
Living people
Avtomobilist Yekaterinburg players
Czech ice hockey forwards
HC Dynamo Pardubice players
HC Slovan Bratislava players
HC Sparta Praha players
Sportspeople from Hradec Králové
Czech expatriate ice hockey players in Russia
Czech expatriate ice hockey players in Slovakia